The 2016 SummerSlam was the 29th annual SummerSlam professional wrestling pay-per-view (PPV) and livestreaming event produced by WWE. It was held for wrestlers from the promotion's Raw and SmackDown brand divisions. The event took place on August 21, 2016, at the Barclays Center in Brooklyn, New York for the second consecutive year. It was the first PPV event held after the brand extension, which was reintroduced in July, went into full effect.

Twelve matches were contested at the event, including three matches on the Kickoff pre-show. In the main event, which was an interbrand match, Raw's Brock Lesnar defeated SmackDown's Randy Orton by technical knockout. In another marquee match, "The Demon King" Finn Bálor defeated Seth Rollins to become the inaugural WWE Universal Champion, which was introduced to be Raw's world championship. Other prominent matches included Dean Ambrose defeating Dolph Ziggler to retain SmackDown's WWE World Championship, and AJ Styles defeated John Cena in a singles match.

Production

Background
SummerSlam is an annual pay-per-view (PPV) and WWE Network event, produced every summer by WWE since 1988. Dubbed "The Biggest Party of the Summer," it is one of the promotion's original four pay-per-views, along with WrestleMania, SummerSlam, and Survivor Series, referred to as the "Big Four". It has since become considered WWE's second biggest event of the year behind WrestleMania. The 2016 event was the 29th event in the SummerSlam chronology and was scheduled to be held on August 21, 2016, at the Barclays Center in Brooklyn, New York for the second consecutive year. It featured wrestlers from the Raw and SmackDown brands, being the first pay-per-view to occur after the brand split went into full effect following its reintroduction the previous month. It was also the first pay-per-view to feature the WWE Universal Championship, following its establishment for Raw the previous month after the WWE World Heavyweight Championship became exclusive to SmackDown and renamed to WWE World Championship.

Ahead of the event, the WWE and KFC, which is that year's event sponsor, held a promotional tie-in for its "Chicken Little" chicken sandwich. It featured a match between The Miz, dressed as "Puppers Cluckers" in a yellow chicken suit and Dolph Ziggler, as Colonel Sanders which took place after the conclusion of the August 15, 2016 episode of SmackDown Live where Ziggler emerged victorious.

Storylines
The card featured twelve matches, including three on the Kickoff pre-show, that resulted from scripted storylines, where wrestlers portrayed heroes, villains, or less distinguishable characters in scripted events that built tension and culminated in a wrestling match or series of matches, with results predetermined by WWE's writers on the Raw and SmackDown brands. Storylines were produced on WWE's weekly television shows, Monday Night Raw and SmackDown Live.

On June 5, WWE granted Brock Lesnar a "one-off opportunity" to return to mixed martial arts competition at UFC 200 on July 9, while also confirming that Lesnar would compete at SummerSlam. On the July 7 episode of SmackDown, Lesnar's SummerSlam opponent was announced as Randy Orton, who was returning from injury. WWE billed the match as "15 years in the making". On July 15, WWE confirmed that the match would still be taking place, despite a USADA notification in regards to Lesnar's UFC fight, stemming from an out-of-competition sample collected on June 28, which tested positive for a banned substance. A second sample taken in-competition on July 9 was also tested positive for the same banned substance, believed to be hydroxy-clomifene, discovered in the previous sample. On July 26, WWE confirmed that Lesnar would not be facing any disciplinary action from the WWE as he is exempt from the WWE Wellness Policy due to his status as a part-time performer. Orton returned at Battleground as the guest on Chris Jericho's "Highlight Reel". Orton said that he only needed one RKO to take down Lesnar and also took a shot at Lesnar's failed drug tests. On the August 1 episode of Raw, Lesnar's manager Paul Heyman proclaimed that Orton would never be able to execute his finisher on Lesnar when Orton suddenly appeared and attacked Lesnar with an RKO. Lesnar subsequently attacked Orton with an F-5 during his match against Fandango on SmackDown the next night. The last Raw before SummerSlam saw Lesnar and Heyman cutting another promo on Orton until Heath Slater interrupted, aiming to earn a WWE contract (as he was undrafted in the WWE draft) by defeating Lesnar. Lesnar attacked Slater with an F-5 to send a message to Orton. Slater faced Orton the next night on SmackDown to earn a contract. Orton intentionally got himself disqualified, mocking Lesnar before attacking Slater with an RKO.

After SmackDown draftee Dean Ambrose retained the WWE World Championship at Battleground against Raw draftees Roman Reigns and Seth Rollins in a triple threat match, Raw was left without a world title. Subsequently, Stephanie McMahon and Mick Foley announced a new championship, the WWE Universal Championship, the following night on Raw to serve as the brand's top championship. It was then announced that the inaugural champion would be crowned at SummerSlam in a singles match; Rollins, as Raw'''s #1 draft pick, was automatically set for that match, while his opponent was determined by two Fatal 4-Way matches that night, with the winners wrestling each other in a singles match. Finn Bálor won the first qualifier by defeating Cesaro, Kevin Owens, and Rusev, while Reigns won the second by defeating Chris Jericho, Sami Zayn, and Sheamus. Bálor then defeated Reigns and was added to the title match at SummerSlam. Bálor and Rollins confronted each other the following week, both promising to win at SummerSlam. Rollins then attempted to attack Bálor, but Bálor countered, forcing Rollins to retreat. Two weeks later, Bálor's alter ego, "The Demon King", confronted Rollins after Rollins called him out.

On the July 26 episode of SmackDown, a Six-Pack Challenge involving John Cena, Bray Wyatt, AJ Styles, Dolph Ziggler, Baron Corbin, and Apollo Crews was held to determine the #1 contender for the WWE World Championship at SummerSlam. Ziggler won the match by pinning Styles. The next week, after Dean Ambrose doubted Ziggler's ability, Wyatt attacked Ziggler and challenged him for his title shot. Ziggler accepted and defeated Wyatt. The next week, after Ambrose and Ziggler teamed up to defeat Wyatt and Erick Rowan, Ambrose performed Dirty Deeds on Ziggler. Ziggler responded by attacking Ambrose with a superkick on their "Miz TV" segment during the final episode of SmackDown before SummerSlam.

At Battleground, Sasha Banks recruited Bayley from NXT as a mystery partner to defeat WWE Women's Champion Charlotte and Dana Brooke in a tag team match when Sasha made Charlotte submit. This earned Sasha a title match against Charlotte the following night on Raw, in which she again made Charlotte submit to win the title. Charlotte invoked her rematch clause five days later to face Sasha for the title at SummerSlam. The following week, a confrontation between the two was interrupted by Chris Jericho and Enzo Amore, resulting in a mixed tag team match, which Charlotte and Jericho won. On the August 8 edition of Raw, Sasha Banks defeated Brooke, resulting in Dana being banned from ringside at SummerSlam.

After the aforementioned mixed tag team match, Chris Jericho attacked Enzo Amore until Big Cass came out to help his partner. Later in the event, Owens told Jericho that he had his back during a backstage interview with Tom Phillips. The following week, Jericho defeated Amore by disqualification when Cass interfered. After the match, Cass challenged Owens and Jericho to a tag team match at SummerSlam, which Owens and Jericho accepted.

After AJ Styles's victory over John Cena at Money in the Bank, The club (Styles, Karl Anderson, and Luke Gallows) began attacking Cena until Enzo Amore and Big Cass came to Cena's aide, setting up a six-man tag team match for Battleground. At the event, Cena, Amore, and Cass defeated The club. During the draft Amore, Cass, Anderson, and Gallows were drafted to Raw, while Cena and Styles were drafted to SmackDown, splitting up the two teams. On the August 2 episode of SmackDown, Styles challenged Cena to another match at SummerSlam, which Cena accepted. On the August 16 episode of SmackDown, after Cena defeated Alberto Del Rio, Styles attacked Cena with a "Phenomenal Forearm," but Cena retaliated with two "Attitude Adjustments," including one through the broadcast table.

On the August 2 episode of SmackDown, Apollo Crews defeated Baron Corbin and Kalisto in a triple threat match to earn an Intercontinental Championship match against The Miz at SummerSlam.

On the July 25 episode of Raw, The New Day were celebrating in the ring on becoming the longest reigning WWE Tag Team Champions. While celebrating with a fan, Luke Gallows and Karl Anderson attacked all three members of New Day. The following week on Raw, Big E and Kofi Kingston defeated Gallows and Anderson. Gallows and Anderson then attacked all three members of New Day, finishing with Gallows and Anderson pulling Big E groin-first into the ring post, causing a contusion in Big E's groin. On August 8, Xavier Woods and Kingston were scheduled to defend the WWE Tag Team Championship against Gallows and Anderson at SummerSlam.

After losing to Cesaro on the August 1 episode of Raw, Sheamus attacked Cesaro. On the August 8 episode of Raw, Cesaro defeated Sheamus again, but lost a match for the United States Championship against Rusev after interference from Sheamus. On the August 15 episode of Raw, Cesaro distracted Sheamus, costing him a match against Sami Zayn. During an ensuing argument, Raw General Manager Mick Foley scheduled a Best-of-Seven Series between the two, with the first match taking place at SummerSlam. On August 19, the match was moved to the SummerSlam Kickoff pre-show.

Eva Marie was drafted to SmackDown, but for several episodes, circumstances, including a pulled hamstring and a wardrobe malfunction, prevented her from making her in-ring debut. On the August 16 episode, Eva Marie no-showed for her match against Naomi. Later that night, Becky Lynch and Carmella took on Natalya and Alexa Bliss; during the match, Marie appeared on the entrance ramp. Naomi then appeared and started to chase Marie, passing the ring at one point. During the confusion, Becky applied her "Dis-Arm-Her" on Natalya, who submitted. Later on, a six-woman tag team match was scheduled for SummerSlam. On August 18, Marie was suspended for 30 days due to a violation of WWE's wellness policy, taking her out of the match. In light of this, WWE's advertising was intentionally vague about whether the match would be turned into a three-on-two handicap or if Natalya and Alexa would have a third partner.

On the August 16 episode of SmackDown, American Alpha, The Hype Bros, and The Usos defeated Breezango, The Ascension, and The Vaudevillains. On August 19, a rematch was scheduled for the SummerSlam Kickoff pre-show. On the same show, Jon Stewart, who had been SummerSlam's guest host the previous year, was announced to be returning to the event as a special guest.

Cancelled match
On the August 1 episode of Raw, after United States Champion Rusev defeated Mark Henry to retain the title, Roman Reigns confronted Rusev. The following week, Reigns interrupted Rusev and Lana's wedding celebration and issued a challenge to Rusev for the title. Rusev declined and the two brawled, causing Lana to fall into a wedding cake. Backstage, Mick Foley told an angered Lana and Rusev that Rusev would be defending his United States title against Reigns at SummerSlam. Later that night, Rusev successfully defended his title in an impromptu match against Cesaro. After the match, Rusev was attacked by Reigns with a Spear. Reigns defeated Rusev in a non-title match the following week.

 Event 

 Pre-show 
Three matches were contested on the SummerSlam Kickoff pre-show. In the first match, American Alpha (Jason Jordan and Chad Gable), The Hype Bros (Zack Ryder and Mojo Rawley), and The Usos (Jey and Jimmy Uso) faced Breezango (Tyler Breeze and Fandango), The Ascension (Konnor and Viktor), and The Vaudevillains (Aiden English and Simon Gotch) in a twelve-man tag team match. Jey Uso won the match for his team by pinning Simon Gotch after a Samoan Splash.

After that, Sami Zayn and Neville squared off against The Dudley Boyz (Bubba Ray Dudley and D-Von Dudley) in a tag team match. In the end, Zayn performed a Helluva Kick on Bubba Ray followed by Neville executing the "Red Arrow" for the pinfall.

Finally, Sheamus wrestled Cesaro in the first match of the best-of-seven series. Sheamus won the match with a "Brogue Kick" on Cesaro for the pinfall.

 Preliminary matches 
The actual pay-per-view opened with Enzo Amore and Big Cass facing Chris Jericho and Kevin Owens. In the climax, Amore executed a diving DDT on Jericho only for Owens to break up the pinfall. Owens and Jericho then performed a Pop-Up "Codebreaker" on Amore, with Jericho pinning Amore for the win.

In the second match, Sasha Banks defended the WWE Women's Championship against Charlotte with Dana Brooke is Banned from ringside. Early in the match, both combatants tried to apply their respective holds on each other but their efforts were not successful. At one point during the match, Charlotte attempted a "Natural Selection", only for Banks to counter into the "Bank Statement". Charlotte eventually executed the "Natural Selection" on Banks for a near-fall. In the end, Banks applied the "Bank Statement", however Charlotte shifted her weight to score a pinfall victory and regain the championship.

Next, The Miz defended the Intercontinental Championship against Apollo Crews. The match ended when The Miz avoided a "Stinger Splash" by Crews, allowing Miz to execute the "Skull Crushing Finale" to retain the title.

In the fourth match, AJ Styles faced John Cena. Early in the match, Styles countered an "Attitude Adjustment" into a Pele Kick and executed a "Styles Clash" for a near-fall, followed by Cena executing an "Attitude Adjustment" on Styles for a near-fall. Styles attempted a Springboard on Cena, which Cena countered into the STF. A trade of reversals from Styles's Calf Crusher and Cena's STF followed. Styles executed a "Phenomenal Forearm" on Cena for a two count. Cena performed a "Super Attitude Adjustment" on Styles for a nearfall. A shocked Cena tried another "Attitude Adjustment", but Styles countered it into a "Styles Clash". After a second "Phenomenal Forearm", Styles pinned Cena to win the match. After the match, Cena removed his armband and put it in the center of the ring before departing backstage to a standing ovation from the crowd.

After that, Jon Stewart, acting as a replacement for the injured Big E, introduced the WWE Tag Team Champions, The New Day (Kofi Kingston and Xavier Woods) for their title defense against Luke Gallows and Karl Anderson. Gallows and Anderson executed the "Magic Killer" on Kingston, but Stewart entered the ring and distracted them. Gallows and Anderson then tried to injure Stewart's groin using the ring post when Big E ran in, making his return, and attacked Gallows and Anderson, thus causing a disqualification. Gallows and Anderson won the match, but The New Day retained the tag team championships.

In the sixth match, Dean Ambrose defended the WWE World Championship against Dolph Ziggler. In the end, Ambrose executed "Dirty Deeds" on Ziggler to retain the title.

After that, Becky Lynch, Naomi, and Carmella were scheduled to face Natalya, Alexa Bliss, and Eva Marie in a six-woman tag team match. After Eva Marie was declared absent, Nikki Bella was introduced as her replacement. The match ended when Nikki performed a Forearm Smash on Carmella, who had been distracted by Natalya and Bliss, and executed a Fireman's Carry Cutter to win the match for her team.

Stephanie McMahon and Mick Foley then unveiled the new WWE Universal Championship belt in the ring. The inaugural champion was then determined in a match between "The Demon King" Finn Bálor and Seth Rollins, in a match that could only end in pinfall or submission. The match ended with Bálor executing the "Coup de Grace" on Rollins to become the inaugural WWE Universal Champion.

Next, Rusev was scheduled to defend the United States Championship against Roman Reigns. However, before the match officially started, Rusev attacked Reigns, resulting in a brawl. While the referees tried to separate the two, Reigns hit Rusev with a chair. Finally, Rusev was declared unable to compete. After the announcement was made, Reigns attacked Rusev with a spear.

 Main event 
In the main event, Brock Lesnar fought Randy Orton. During the match, Lesnar threw Orton off the barricade through a broadcast table. Orton executed an RKO on the top of another broadcast table. Orton carried Lesnar back to the ring and performed an off-the-rope DDT. Orton then executed a second RKO for a near-fall. As Orton attempted a punt kick, Lesnar countered with an F-5 for a near-fall. Lesnar removed his gloves and attacked Orton bare-knuckled, legitimately hitting him with numerous elbow strikes which caused Orton to bleed profusely. This led to Lesnar winning via technical knockout and Randy Orton tended to by WWE medical personnel. Afterwards, Shane McMahon came to the ring to check on Orton and was immediately given an F5 by Lesnar when confronted.

 Aftermath 
Following the event, Randy Orton received ten staples to close a laceration on his forehead. Reportedly, there was also a backstage confrontation between Brock Lesnar and Chris Jericho. According to Dave Meltzer of Wrestling Observer Newsletter, Jericho questioned WWE producer Michael Hayes about whether the finish was planned or not. After getting no response from Hayes, Jericho became angrier. Lesnar confronted Jericho and the two exchanged words and tangled up against a wall before Triple H and Vince McMahon broke up the situation, with McMahon stating that the ending was planned.

 Raw 
The following night on Raw, Finn Bálor vacated the Universal Championship due to a shoulder injury incurred at SummerSlam. On the same night, General Manager Mick Foley scheduled a Fatal 4-Way elimination match for the next week's Raw to crown a new champion. Seth Rollins, Kevin Owens, Big Cass, and Roman Reigns each qualified for the match by defeating Sami Zayn, Neville, Rusev, and Chris Jericho, respectively. Owens subsequently won the WWE Universal Championship. Also on the post-SummerSlam Raw, Sasha Banks was declared to be out of action due to an injury, reportedly up to two months. However, Charlotte's victory celebration was interrupted by Bayley, who was announced by Mick Foley as the Raw women's division's newest member. Furthermore, The Dudley Boyz announced their retirement, but were first confronted by The Shining Stars and then attacked by Luke Gallows and Karl Anderson, who put D-Von through a table.

After SmackDown unveiled their new titles on the post-SummerSlam SmackDown, the WWE Women's Championship and WWE Tag Team Championship were subsequently renamed to Raw Women's Championship and Raw Tag Team Championship, respectively. Also, the finals of the Cruiserweight Classic occurred on September 14, 2016, and T. J. Perkins became the inaugural WWE Cruiserweight Champion for the Raw brand.

 SmackDown 
On the August 23 episode of SmackDown, AJ Styles was declared the No. 1 contender for the WWE World Championship at Backlash. Styles also defeated Dolph Ziggler to prevent him from being inserted into the title match as well.

When Randy Orton spoke about his match against Brock Lesnar and his future, he was interrupted by Bray Wyatt, and the two were scheduled for a match at Backlash. On August 29, 2016, WWE scheduled a rematch between Lesnar and Orton for a WWE house show on September 24 in Chicago, Illinois, where Lesnar defeated Orton.

Also on the following SmackDown'', the WWE SmackDown Women's Championship and WWE SmackDown Tag Team Championship were unveiled for the brand. SmackDown's six active women were scheduled to compete in a six-pack elimination challenge for the title at Backlash, while a tag team tournament occurred over the next few weeks, culminating in a final match for the tag team titles at Backlash.

Results

References

External links 
 

2016
2016 WWE Network events
2016 in New York City
Events in Brooklyn, New York
Professional wrestling in New York City
2016 WWE pay-per-view events
August 2016 events in the United States